Osvaldo Héctor Cruz (born 29 May 1931) is an Argentine former footballer who played as a forward for clubs in Argentina, Brazil and Chile; and in the Argentina national team in the 1958 FIFA World Cup in Sweden.

Honours
Independiente
 Argentine Primera División: 1960

Argentina
 Copa América: 1955 and 1957

References

External links
 
 

1931 births
Living people
Argentine footballers
Association football forwards
Argentina international footballers
1958 FIFA World Cup players
Argentine Primera División players
Club Atlético Independiente footballers
Sociedade Esportiva Palmeiras players
Unión Española footballers
Copa América-winning players
Argentine expatriate footballers
Argentine expatriate sportspeople in Chile
Expatriate footballers in Chile
Argentine expatriate sportspeople in Brazil
Expatriate footballers in Brazil
Footballers from Buenos Aires